Mudasir Zafar (born 29 November 1986) is an Indian actor. He is an alumnus of Whistling Woods International film school of Subhash Ghai where he learned his acting skills from Naseeruddin Shah, Benjamin Gilani  and Rob Recee. He founded the Organic Motion Pictures, a film production house in 2017.

Early life 
Zafar was born in Jammu and Kashmir. He got his primary education from Atman School. Later, he studied at the Model Academy in Jammu and then he pursued his B.A. and L.L.B. in Bangalore from KLE Society's Law College. He also played in the Under-19 National Cricket team of Jammu and Kashmir.

Career 
Zafar debuted in the film Tension Mat Le Yaar released on 12 April 2012 and later in a love story film titled My Friends Dulhania. The film received mixed reviews from the critics. Zafar also acted in various short films like Meera, Parchayee & Am-Notness along with Rajshri Deshpande for Airtelxstream. He has also worked in some music videos. Zafar appeared in an interview with a film critic Komal Nahta along with the film cast on Zee ETC Bollywood.

In 2020, Zafar starred in a Hindi feature film Nobel Peace along with Hiten Tejwani. In the film he plays a character of Hayan Mir, a small town man who is trying to find a permanent solution to the religious bitterness. Nobel Peace won the Best Film Jury at the 10th Dada Sahab Phalke Film Festival 2020. Nobel Peace also won the Best Screenplay award at Indian Cine Film Festival Mumbai 2020. 

His digital film Epiphany has won the best film award at Little Seal Studios and best editing at My Film Project film challenge. In a recently concluded video interview with the Journalist of Navbharat Times, Zafar was seen talking about the struggle of actors.

Filmography

Featured films

Short films

Music videos

References

External links 
 
 

1986 births
Living people
Indian male film actors